Méteren (from Flemish; Meteren in modern Dutch spelling) is a commune in the Nord department in northern France. In October 1914, the British army passed through Meteren during the Retreat from Mons, and the future Field-Marshal Montgomery of Alamein received a DSO at the rank of Lieutenant.

Heraldry

See also
Communes of the Nord department

References

Communes of Nord (French department)
French Flanders